A cubic centimetre (or cubic centimeter in US English) (SI unit symbol: cm3; non-SI abbreviations: cc and ccm) is a commonly used unit of volume that corresponds to the volume of a cube that measures 1 cm × 1 cm × 1 cm. One cubic centimetre corresponds to a volume of one millilitre.  The mass of one cubic centimetre of water at 3.98 °C (the temperature at which it attains its maximum density) is almost equal to one gram. 

In internal combustion engines, "cc" refers to the total volume of its engine displacement in cubic centimetres. The displacement can be calculated using the formula

Conversions

1 millilitre = 1 cm3
1 litre = 1000 cm3
1 cubic inch = .

Unicode character 
The "cubic centimetre" symbol is encoded by Unicode at code point .

See also 
 Cubic inch

References

Units of volume
SI derived units
Centimetre–gram–second system of units